Olga Götilda Katarina Sandberg (Stockholm, 21 December 1844- September 1926), was a Swedish ballerina.

Sandberg was a student at the Royal Swedish Ballet in 1854 and second dancer in 1865–1870. She was a student of Gasperini. She performed at Victoria-Theater in Berlin, in Rostock and Lemberg. She was active at the Wiener Staatsoper in Vienna in 1873–1878.

Her best known parts were La magniola, Polka coquette, Valse, Jalousie de metier, Polka mazurka and the abbess in Robert.

References 

 Svenskt porträttgalleri / XXI. Tonkonstnärer och sceniska artister (biografier af Adolf Lindgren & Nils Personne)

1844 births
Swedish ballerinas
1926 deaths
19th-century Swedish ballet dancers
Royal Swedish Ballet dancers